The Scandinavian Cup is a series of cross-country skiing events arranged by the International Ski Federation (FIS). The Cup is one of the nine FIS Cross-Country Continental Cups, a series of second-level cross-country skiing competitions ranked below the Cross-Country World Cup. The Scandinavian Cup is open for competitors from all nations, but eight main countries are associated to the Scandinavian Cup; Denmark, Norway, Sweden, Finland, Iceland, Latvia, Lithuania and Estonia.

The Scandinavian Cup has been held annually since the 2004–05 season.

World Cup qualification
In the end of certain periods, the overall leaders for both genders receive a place in the World Cup in the following period. The overall winners of the season receive a place in the World Cup in the beginning of the following season.

Overall winners

Men

Women

References

External links
 Results- Norwegian Ski Federation
 Hall of Fame – Scandinavian Cup, Men at Skisport365.com
 Hall of Fame – Scandinavian Cup, Women at Skisport365.com

FIS Cross-Country Continental Cup
Recurring sporting events established in 2004
2004 establishments in Norway
2004 establishments in Sweden
2004 establishments in Finland